Bro is a locality situated in Upplands-Bro Municipality, Stockholm County, Sweden with 7,050 inhabitants in 2010.

It is situated 10 km north-west of the municipal seat Kungsängen. Since 2000 Bro has a station on the Stockholm commuter rail network and a bus stop located near the station.

See also
 Bro Church

References 

Populated places in Upplands-Bro Municipality
Metropolitan Stockholm